Zariadres was an Orontid ruler of Sophene.

Name 
Zariadres is the Greek transliteration of an Iranian name, attested as ZRYTR (ZRYHR) in the Aramaic engravings in Sevan and Siwnik, and as Zareh in Armenian sources. The name is derived from Old Iranian Zari āθra ("with golden fire").

Biography 
Strabo cites Sophene being taken over by a "general" of king Antiochus III by 200 BC, called Zariadres.

Following the defeat of Antiochus III by the Romans at the Battle of Magnesia in 190 BC, Zariadres and Artaxias revolted and with Roman consent began to reign as kings under the terms of the Treaty of Apamea in 188 BC—Zariadres over Sophene and Artaxias over Armenia.

It is possible that Zariadres (Dsariadres) was the father of Abdissares, although the scant historical records have Abdissares ruling before Zariadres.
The name written as Dsariadris might be a Greek corruption of the name Bagdassar.
A hypothesis is that king Bagdassar was forced to accept rule by king Antiochus III, but stayed as a Satrap, paying tribute until the Battle of Magnesia allowed him to reassert his independence. Strabo was writing 200 years after these events and may not have been accurate.

Over a dozen stone boundary markers have been discovered on the territory of modern Armenia from the time of the reign of Artashes with Aramaic inscriptions, before their discovery the existence of these stones was attested by Moses of Chorene. In these inscriptions Artashes claims descent from the Yervanduni (Orontid) Dynasty: King Artaxias, the son of Orontid Zariadres.

References

Sources 
 
 
 
 

Kings of Sophene
Seleucid satraps
188 BC deaths